Henrico Botes (born 24 December 1979, in Rehoboth) is a former Namibian football striker. He played for Platinum Stars, Bidvest Wits and University of Pretoria F.C. in the South African Premier Soccer League and Namibia national team. He is a striker that his coaches have always believed in due to his functionality.

He has also captained the national team.

He missed most of the 07–08 season and the 2008 African Nations Cup due to injury.

On 31 November 2016, Botes scored penalty in Platinum Stars’ 3-1 defeat to Free State Stars in a league match, which was his 50th goal in 195 starts since he started playing in the PSL in 2005.

References

External links
 

1979 births
Living people
Namibian men's footballers
Moroka Swallows F.C. players
Platinum Stars F.C. players
Association football forwards
Namibian expatriate sportspeople in South Africa
Namibian expatriate footballers
Namibia international footballers
Ramblers F.C. players
People from Rehoboth, Namibia
Expatriate soccer players in South Africa